"Yaşa Fenerbahçe" or "Viva Fenerbahçe" (also known as the "Anthem of Fenerbahçe" or the "Fenerbahçe March"), is the official anthem of Fenerbahçe. The official recorded 1974 version of the anthem by Nesrin Sipahi is mandatorily played and sung in the home stadium before every match with the opponents listening, regardless of the branch. It was written by Fenerbahçe's ex-goalkeeper Fecri Ebcioğlu. 

Before every football match, first, the "Mohikan Show" is performed, where Mohican war music is played and fans perform rituals with scarves. After that, Yaşa Fenerbahçe is played and finally İstiklal Marşı is sung.

Content 

In 1974, Fenerbahçe had won four cups only in football, and many more in other branches. In honor of this, an official team anthem was recorded. It was mainly sung by Nesrin Sipahi, but the team coach Didi along with the 1973-1974 squad was also among the singers. The anthem talks about the unmatched legendary status of Fenerbahçe, and some of its legendary players, with the line "Cihatlar, Lefterler, Canlar, Fikretler" being a reference to Cihat Arman, Lefter Küçükandonyadis, Can Bartu, Fikret Kırcan and Fikret Arıcan.

Lyrics

100th year anthem 
Yüzüncü Yıl Marşı was the anthem composed for the 100th year of Fenerbahçe by Kıraç. It is still used in the Fenerbahçe stadium.

Lyrics

Notes

References 

Fenerbahçe S.K.